Black Butterfly is a 2017 American thriller film directed by Brian Goodman and written by Marc Frydman and Justin Stanley. The film stars Antonio Banderas, Jonathan Rhys Meyers, Piper Perabo, Abel Ferrara, Vincent Riotta and Nathalie Rapti Gomez. It was released on May 26, 2017, by Lionsgate Premiere. It is based on a 2008 French television film, Papillon Noir, directed by Christian Faure.

Plot

Paul Lopez is an alcoholic screenwriter suffering from writer's block. His realtor, Laura, arrives with a couple, the Owens, to show them Paul's house, for sale because of Paul's financial difficulties.  Before leaving to go hunting, Paul asks Laura to meet later at a diner.  On his way, he receives a phone call advising his script cannot be submitted in its current form. Frustrated, Paul gets into an altercation with a truck driver who won't let him pass.

He meets Laura. News of the "Roadside Killer" is being broadcast. The Owens are not interested in the house but Laura is interested in his work. He confides he has not written in a long time.  Before leaving they make a dinner date.  Meanwhile, the truck driver enters the restaurant.  Upset, he attacks Paul, but is thrown out of the diner by Jack, another patron.

Driving, Paul spots Jack hitchhiking and picks him up, inviting him to stay the night in his guestroom. Later Paul explains his phone connection is out and there is no internet. He tells Jack his history as a writer. Jack asks to read one of Paul's scripts and is given an unsold script called Under the Clock. Paul notices Jack's tattoo while he is swimming in an artificial pond near the house and Jack explains that it is a prison tattoo of a black butterfly; very rare and very hard to catch. Jack persuades Paul to quit drinking and to write a script based on the events that just happened around their encounter.

Jack reads the first draft without Paul's consent and, unsatisfied, throws it into the fire, proposing that the character of "Jack" be a person working in collusion with the truck driver. That night Jack sneaks into Paul's room and puts a knife to his throat to show him that, unlike the girl pleading with her attacker in his script, in reality the victim does not speak a word. While Jack is chopping wood the next morning, Paul looks through old newspaper clippings and evidence he has collected about young women's disappearances but quickly hides it when Jack walks in. Later, while working on the script, Paul hears a gunshot and a woman scream. He goes outside to investigate but Jack indicates that it was a bird screeching because of the gunshot.

A delivery man arrives with some goods. Jack points a shotgun at Paul and tells him not to walk too far. Once Paul gets rid of the delivery man, he argues with Jack about his twisted conduct. Attempting to leave, Paul ends up punching Jack but is wrestled to the ground and taken prisoner. Jack explains that he is paranoid about going back to prison. That night Paul sneaks out for drink but is stopped by Jack who then forces him to smash all the bottles, insisting that he is helping him. Later in the night, Paul has difficulties writing owing to Jack terrorizing him.

Laura arrives on a foggy morning asking why Paul hasn't answered her calls for days. At that moment, Paul rushes to her and tells her to give him her car keys so that they can escape Jack. Halfway down the road, Jack walks out in front of them and shoots at the car. He then forces them to push the car into the water and to come back to the house. Soon a sheriff arrives looking for a missing girl who was supposed to have been delivering a package. Paul says that he hasn't seen the girl but attempts to scream out a message, causing Jack to run out, force the sheriff into the trunk of his police vehicle and shoot him. Paul locks Jack out and barricades the windows to protect himself and Laura. When Jack pretends to drive the sheriff's car away, they attempt to run through the woods to catch the half-hourly train but Laura trips over a log and Jack catches them.

That night Jack insists that Paul has broken their agreement. Laura, surprisingly, stabs Jack in the back with a pair of sewing scissors. Paul grabs the shotgun but Jack says he is not brave enough to shoot and wrestles it from him. He takes Laura into the study and ties Paul to a chair. Paul breaks a picture and uses the broken glass to cut himself free, goes downstairs where he picks up a  shotgun and enters the study. Laura is unconscious on the floor. Paul explains to Jack that he understands what it is like to "kill" and believes Jack has been sent by God so that Paul can kill Jack and frame him as the Roadside Killer. He shoots at Jack but the bullets are blanks. Jack grabs the shotgun and knocks him unconscious.

Paul wakes next morning and finds a group of FBI agents searching his house. He sees the sheriff uninjured and the truck driver, Laura, and Jack, all wearing FBI badges. Jack explains that they have been "tracking" him for three years and plays the recording of Paul's explanation of what it is like to kill. Paul complains that any evidence collected from his house is tainted because Jack and Laura had access to the house and could have planted it and that the tape recording is just his notes for a screenplay. Jack fears that they do not have enough evidence for a conviction. He notices an excavator with dirt on it. Looking through Paul's possessions, he finds a picture of Paul's wife in a yard that shows no artificial pond. Paul is impressed and attempts to make a deal to avoid the death penalty but Jack prefers "his own ending". The film ends with Paul waking up from what appeared to be a dream that happened to be the events of the film, and quickly attempts to type out the dream as a new script titled Black Butterfly.

Cast
 Antonio Banderas as Paul Lopez
 Jonathan Rhys Meyers as Jack
 Piper Perabo as Laura Johnson
 Abel Ferrara as Pat
 Vincent Riotta as Lt. Carcano
 Nathalie Rapti Gomez as Julie
 Randall Paul as Mr. Owen
 Katie McGovern as Nancy Barrows

Release
The film was released on May 26, 2017, by Lionsgate Premiere.

Critical response
The review aggregator website Rotten Tomatoes gives the film an approval rating of 40% based on 20 reviews with an average rating of 4.9/10. At Metacritic, the film has an average score of 43 out of 100 based on 7 critics, indicating "mixed or average reviews".

References

External links
 
 

2017 films
2017 thriller films
American thriller films
Lionsgate films
Films about nightmares
Films about writers
Films about filmmaking
Films scored by Federico Jusid
American remakes of French films
2010s English-language films
Films directed by Brian Goodman
2010s American films